

People
Surname
Liebe (German for "love") is a surname that may refer to:
 Carl Christian Vilhelm Liebe (1820–1900), Danish politician
 Christian Liebe (1654–1708), German composer
 Friederich Liebe (1862–1950), Australian building contractor and farmer in Western Australia
 Heinrich Liebe (1908–1997), German naval officer
 Karl Theodor Liebe (1828–1894), German geologist and ornithologist
 Louis Liebe (1819–1900), German conductor and composer
 Otto Liebe (1860–1929), Prime Minister of Denmark 1920

Middle name
 David Liebe Hart, also credited as D.L. Hart, (born 1957), American outsider musician, puppeteer and actor.

Given name
 Liebe Sokol Diamond (1931–2017), American pediatric orthopedic surgeon

Film
 Love (1927 German film), German title Liebe, a German film
 Love (1956 film), German title Liebe, a West German drama film

See also
 Lieb (disambiguation)
 Leeb, a surname
 Liebing, disambiguation

Surnames from nicknames